The Shire of Tallangatta was a local government area about  northeast of Melbourne, the state capital of Victoria, Australia.

History

Tallangatta was first incorporated as the Towong Road District on 12 March 1869, and was proclaimed the Shire of Towong on 1 May 1874. In October 1920, the Corryong Riding and part of the Murray Riding split away to form the Shire of Upper Murray. On 8 March 1974, the shire was renamed Tallangatta.

On 18 November 1994, the Shire of Tallangatta was abolished, and along with the Shire of Upper Murray, was merged into the newly created Shire of Towong — hence restoring the original pre-1920 entity.

Wards

Tallangatta was divided into three ridings, each of which elected three councillors:
 Murray Riding
 Mitta Mitta Riding
 Tallangatta Riding

Towns and localities

* Council seat.

Population

* Estimate in the 1958 Victorian Year Book.

References

External links
 Victorian Places - Towong Shire

Tallangatta